Oxymyia is a genus of flies in the family Stratiomyidae.

Distribution
Madagascar.

Species
Oxymyia epacta Kertész, 1916

References

Stratiomyidae
Brachycera genera
Taxa named by Kálmán Kertész
Diptera of Africa
Endemic fauna of Madagascar